Shady Grove Methodist Church and Cemetery is a historic church in Logan, Alabama.  Built in 1892, it was added to the Alabama Register of Landmarks and Heritage in 1999 and the National Register of Historic Places in 2002.

References

External links
 
 
 

Methodist churches in Alabama
Churches on the National Register of Historic Places in Alabama
National Register of Historic Places in Cullman County, Alabama
Properties on the Alabama Register of Landmarks and Heritage
Gothic Revival church buildings in Alabama
Churches completed in 1892
Churches in Cullman County, Alabama